Chezala is a genus of moths of the family Oecophoridae.

Species
Chezala aleurias  Turner, 1917
Chezala anaxia  Turner, 1941
Chezala aterpna  Turner, 1941
Chezala brachypepla  (Meyrick, 1883)
Chezala butyrina  Turner, 1941
Chezala carella  (Walker, 1864)
Chezala carphalea  (Meyrick, 1884)
Chezala carphodes  Turner, 1941
Chezala cataxera  (Meyrick, 1884)
Chezala cathara  Diakonoff, 1954
Chezala conjunctella  (Walker, 1864)
Chezala crypsileuca  (Meyrick, 1884)
Chezala erythrastis  (Meyrick, 1889)
Chezala fulvia  (Butler, 1882)
Chezala galactina  (Turner, 1916)
Chezala glaphyropla  (Meyrick, 1884)
Chezala isocycla  Meyrick, 1922
Chezala leparga  (Turner, 1917)
Chezala liopa  Turner, 1927
Chezala liquida  (Meyrick, 1914)
Chezala limitaris  Meyrick, 1915
Chezala lucens  Meyrick, 1915
Chezala lunularis  Meyrick, 1926
Chezala maculata  Turner, 1941
Chezala micranepsia  (Turner, 1927)
Chezala minyra  (Meyrick, 1914)
Chezala ochrobapta  Lower, 1920
Chezala osteochroa  (Turner, 1898)
Chezala privatella  (Walker, 1864)
Chezala silvestris  Turner, 1917
Chezala torva  Turner, 1941

References

Markku Savela's ftp.funet.fi

 
Oecophorinae